John R. Whittaker (born November 13, 1944) was a Canadian Member of Parliament for the Okanagan—Similkameen—Merritt riding in British Columbia from 1988–1993 for the New Democratic Party.

References

Members of the House of Commons of Canada from British Columbia
New Democratic Party MPs
Living people
1944 births
Place of birth missing (living people)